The office of the Minister of State for Youth and Children is a ministerial post of the Albanian Government focused on issues related to the youth and children. The department develops and monitors policies that safeguard the rights of young people, cooperating with organizations working on the respected field and with international youth exchange programs.The current minister is Bora Muzhaqi.

References

Youth and children